Walter Island is one of several uninhabited Canadian arctic islands in Nunavut, Canada located within James Bay.

The island takes part in surveys for polar bear summer refuge.

References

Islands of James Bay
Uninhabited islands of Qikiqtaaluk Region